Struszewo  is a village in the administrative district of Gmina Borzytuchom, within Bytów County, Pomeranian Voivodeship, in northern Poland.

The village has a population of 173.

References

Struszewo